De balneis Puteolanis ("On the baths of Pozzuoli") is a medieval didactic poem in Latin, attributed to Peter of Eboli, describing the thermal baths of Pozzuoli in the Campi Flegrei region of Campania. The poem has the alternative title .

The poem in thirty-five epigrams was written in the last decade of the twelfth century, probably in 1197. It is dedicated to the emperor ("Cesaris ad laudem"), probably Henry VI, Holy Roman Emperor. The author "reports every detail about more than thirty different thermal sites in the Campi Flegrei, including all therapeutic effects of their waters."

The attribution to Peter of Eboli (Petrus de Ebulo) is generally made "with some certainty", although some historians associate it with the work of Sicilian physician Alcadino di Siracusa.

De balneis Puteolanis was popular in its time and survives in a number of manuscript versions. It was also translated into vernacular languages and was issued in 12 editions in print, from 1457 to 1607.

Many surviving manuscript versions are especially notable for their accompanying illustrations of medieval bathing.

Many of the thermal baths described in the Pozzuoli region were destroyed in the 1538 volcanic eruption which transformed the landscape of the Campi Flegrei caldera and created Monte Nuovo.

See also
Regimen sanitatis Salernitanum

References

Further reading

Gallery

External links

Comune di Pozzuoli
Latin text of De balneis Puteolanis (Cod. Bodmer 135)
Bibliothèque nationale de France: Latin 8161
Biblioteca Angelica Ms.1474

1197 books
1197 in Europe
12th-century poems
12th century in Italy
12th-century Latin books
12th-century illuminated manuscripts
Bathing
Books about Italy
History of medieval medicine
Hydrotherapy
Medieval literature
Henry VI, Holy Roman Emperor